Jafar Bolhari, M.D. (born August 6, 1948), is an Iranian psychiatrist and researcher. He is a professor of psychiatry at the Spiritual Health Research Center, Iran University of Medical Sciences, and he worked for 25 years as the director of Tehran Institute of Psychiatry: School of Behavioral Sciences and Mental Health خانه since 1992.

Bolhari has also been the director of the Iranian Mental Health Research Network since its formation in 2006. His major areas of interest are community mental health services, spiritual and religious therapy, and drug abuse prevention programs.

He is one of the founders of the Program of Integration of Mental Health Care in the Primary Health Care System in Iran.

Bolhari is the author of several English articles and Persian-language books for health care providers with different educational levels. Some of his books are in the following topics:

1. Mental Health for Health Workers

2. A Guide to Implementation of OSCE in Iran

3. Effective Communication and mental health care

4. Spiritual and Religious skills/Therapy

5. Spirituality in clinic and for University Students

References

External links 
 List of published books - Iranian National Library 
 Articles Indexed in JSTOR
 Article databank
 List of articles in Persian
 Iranian Journal of Psychiatry and Clinical Pshychology

Academic staff of Iran University of Medical Sciences
Iranian psychiatrists
Living people
1948 births